Melanie Ann Stansbury (born January 31, 1979) is an American politician serving as the U.S. representative from New Mexico's 1st congressional district since 2021. The district includes most of Albuquerque and most of its suburbs. A Democrat, Stansbury was formerly a member of the New Mexico House of Representatives from the 28th district.

Early life and education 
Stansbury was born in Farmington, New Mexico, and raised in Albuquerque. After graduating from Cibola High School in 1997, she earned a Bachelor of Arts in human ecology and natural science from Saint Mary's College of California in 2002. She then earned a Master of Science in development sociology with a minor in American Indian studies from Cornell University in 2007, where she was a PhD candidate.

Early career
Stansbury began her career as an ecology instructor at the New Mexico Museum of Natural History and Science. As a White House Fellow, she worked as a policy advisor on the Council on Environmental Quality. She was a consultant at Sandia National Laboratories and later served as a program examiner in the Office of Management and Budget during the Obama administration. She worked on the staff of the United States Senate Committee on Energy and Natural Resources and as an aide to Senator Maria Cantwell. Since 2017, she has worked as a consultant and senior advisor at the Utton Transboundary Resources Center of the University of New Mexico.

New Mexico House of Representatives

Stansbury ran unopposed in the 2018 Democratic primary for the 28th district of the New Mexico House of Representatives. In the general election, she defeated Republican incumbent Jimmie C. Hall, who had held the seat for seven terms.

Stansbury was again unopposed in the 2020 primary. She defeated Republican Thomas R. Stull and Libertarian Robert Vaillancourt in the general election.

In the House, Stansbury introduced legislation to improve the state's energy conservation and water resource management. She served as the vice chair of the Energy, Environment & Natural Resources Committee.

Upon Stansbury's resignation from the state legislature, the Bernalillo County Commission appointed Pamelya Herndon as her replacement.

U.S. House of Representatives

Elections

2021 special 

After Joe Biden announced Deb Haaland as his nominee for United States Secretary of the Interior, Stansbury announced her campaign for the special election to fill the seat. In the first round of voting by the state Democratic committee, Stansbury placed second after State Senator Antoinette Sedillo Lopez and automatically advanced to the runoff. In the second round of voting, she defeated Sedillo Lopez by six votes. As no Republican had represented the district since 2009, The Santa Fe New Mexican labeled her "a heavy favorite".

She defeated State Senator Mark Moores and former Public Lands Commissioner Aubrey Dunn Jr. in the June 1 election in a landslide. Her margin of victory was slightly larger than President Biden's 23-point victory in the district in 2020, and significantly  larger than Deb Haaland's in 2020 for the House.

Tenure 
On August 12, 2022, she voted to pass the Inflation Reduction Act of 2022.

Committee assignments
 Committee on Natural Resources
 Subcommittee on Water, Oceans, and Wildlife
 Subcommittee for Indigenous Peoples of the United States
 Committee on Science, Space, and Technology
 Subcommittee on Energy
 Subcommittee on Research and Technology

Caucus memberships
 Congressional Progressive Caucus
 Congressional LGBTQ+ Equality Caucus
 Democratic Women's Caucus

Political positions 
In a questionnaire created by the Adelante Progressive Caucus, Stansbury pledged support for Medicare for All legislation, a federal assault weapons ban, the D.C. statehood movement, canceling student loan debt, federal marijuana legalization, and several other progressive policies. She was endorsed by abortion rights group Voteprochoice.

Electoral history

Personal life 
Stansbury lives in Albuquerque. She joined Grant Chapel AME Church to celebrate Martin Luther King Jr. Day.

See also
Women in the United States House of Representatives

Notes

References

External links 

 Representative Melanie Stansbury official U.S. House website
 Campaign website

 

|-

|-

1979 births
21st-century American politicians
21st-century American women politicians
Articles containing video clips
Cornell University alumni
Democratic Party members of the United States House of Representatives from New Mexico
Female members of the United States House of Representatives
Living people
Democratic Party members of the New Mexico House of Representatives
People from Farmington, New Mexico
Politicians from Albuquerque, New Mexico
Saint Mary's College of California alumni
White House Fellows
Women state legislators in New Mexico